Mark Mason may refer to:
Mark Mason (athlete) (born 1969), retired Guyanese long jumper
Mark Mason (announcer), American public address announcer for the Portland Trail Blazers
Mark Mason, pseudonym of Septimus Winner (1827–1902), American songwriter
Mark Mason (cricketer) (born 1975), English cricketer 
Mark Mason, manager of the York Revolution in the ALPB
Mark Mason (executive), American business executive